The Secret Hour is a science-fiction fantasy novel written by Scott Westerfeld. It was published by EOS Books, a now defunct branch of HarperCollins, in 2008. It is the first book of The Midnighters Trilogy.

Plot summary

15-year-old Jessica Day moves with her family to Bixby, Oklahoma after her mother is employed at a high-tech aerospace company.  Soon after the move, Jessica awakens to find time frozen and rain stopped in mid air. Although she thinks it is a dream, she is suspicious when she wakes to find her clothes wet. The next night, it happens again.  Leaving her room, she finds that her family is frozen and the only other living thing is a cat, which leads her out of her house.  Once outside, the cat transforms into a snake, revealing that it is actually a slither.  It, along with other slithers and a darkling in the form of a large cat, attacks her. Jessica is rescued by the "Midnighters": Dess, Rex and Melissa, who chase away the animals using thirteen letter words and steel.

The next day, they explain that in Bixby time freezes for an hour every midnight and that only Midnighters - people born at the moment of midnight - can enter it.  Creatures known as darklings live in this secret hour where they can hide from advances in human technology.  Darklings hate people and fear new inventions, complex concepts and the number 13. It was the darklings who took one hour of each 25-hour-day and hid inside it so that people couldn't get to them.  They also explain that each Midnighter has a special power - Dess is a polymath, Rex is a Seer (someone who can read the lore - the ancient history of the midnighters) and Melissa is a mindcaster (meaning she has a variety of telepathic abilities). They don't know what Jessica's power is, except that it isn't the same as any of theirs.

The next midnight, Jonathan, a boy from Jessica's school, arrives outside her house, and takes her flying with him - he is an Acrobat, and in the Secret Hour gravity does not have a strong hold on him. He and Rex don't get along, and the other Midnighters avoid talking about him. After flying for most of the hour the pair are chased by a darkling and narrowly escape - only to be arrested by policemen enforcing Bixby's eleven o'clock curfew. Jessica is grounded for the rest of the month. Meanwhile, the Midnighters are becoming suspicious of why the darklings, who normally avoid Midnighters, are so intent on killing Jessica.

Rex decides to take Jessica out to the Snake Pit, a place in the badlands, where she will be able to discover her power. Unfortunately, the badlands are also the home to the darklings. Dess sets up protection beforehand and the Midnighters plan to be inside it before the Secret Hour arrives. However, they are all late, and rely on Jonathan to fly them inside the protection, which causes Rex to get jealous and Melissa to get disgusted and angry. The darklings are so desperate to attack Jessica that they suicidally attack the defenses, weakening them considerably. Just before the defenses collapse, Rex discovers Jessica's power is Flame-bringer, but none of the group know how they can make a fire. As the defenses are breached, Jessica realizes that her watch is still ticking, implying that her ability allows her to use technology in the secret hour.  She uses a flashlight to kill the darklings, and the Midnighters leave safely.

References

Westerfeld, S. (2004). The Secret Hour, London: Atom.

External links
Midnighters: The Secret Hour (Official website)
The Midnighters (A fan site)

2004 American novels
2004 science fiction novels
American fantasy novels
American science fiction novels
American young adult novels
Aurealis Award-winning works
Contemporary fantasy novels
Eos Books books
Novels by Scott Westerfeld
Novels set in Oklahoma
Tulsa County, Oklahoma